Rosny Park is a suburb of Hobart, Tasmania, located in the City of Clarence on the eastern shore of the Derwent River. It is about five kilometres from the city centre of Hobart. Rosny Park is the commercial twin of its residential namesake, Rosny.

History
The history of Rosny Park goes back to first settlement where the area was part of Kangaroo Point, later renamed Bellerive.
The area was rezoned splitting the areas of Bellerive and Rosny Park and gazetted as Rosny Park in 1977 and the boundaries re-gazetted in 1999.

Rosny was named for a family name of W.A. Bethune, the holder of the original grant on the point, and he named it after his ancestor, the Duc de Maximilien de Bethune Sully, of Rosny-sur-Seine near Mantes in France.

Rosny Farm c.1818 is located within the Rosny Park boundary. The Rosny Barn was re-developed in 2006 to a multi-purpose, small capacity arts venue situated in the cultural hub of Hobart's Eastern Shore. Rosny Cottage (now a Museum) and the School House Gallery (a replica of a schoolhouse that was built at Osterly in central Tasmania in 1890) are also located within the walls of the farm.

Kangaroo Point Post Office opened on 24 June 1832. It was renamed Bellerive in 1882 and was closed and relocated to the Rosny Park office in 1982.

Rosny Park has grown dramatically in the last half of the 20th century from being a small commercial precinct serving the nearby suburbs of Rosny, Montagu Bay, Warrane and Mornington to replacing nearby Bellerive as Clarence's primary commercial service district, or CBD.
https://www.placenames.tas.gov.au

Today
Centred on Bligh Street and the Rosny Park Transit Mall, Rosny Park has effectively become the administrative, commercial and transportational centre of the City of Clarence, and therefore Hobart's eastern shore. It caters for banking (all major banks) and postal services, and government administration. It is the home of the Clarence City Council, a local court chambers, and the local branch of the State Library of Tasmania. It also has branches of the Commonwealth Office, the Australian Archives, the Department of Justice, the Education Department, Service Tasmania, and the Rosny Historic Centre (a small local museum and historic property). The Clarence branch of the Returned and Services League (RSL) is based in Rosny Park. There is also childcare, and nursing home facilities nearby.

Rosny Park is home to Bellerive Police station, the Tasmanian Fire Service, and Bayfield Street Medical Centre, as well as Warrane barracks of the 12th/40th battalion of the Australian Army Reserve.

It is the primary retail area of the eastern shore, home to Eastlands Shopping Centre, now the biggest in the state. The shopping centre has continued to grow since it first opened in 1965, becoming fully enclosed in 1972, and includes 100 stores catering for all varieties, including food stores, fashion, supermarkets, a Kmart and Tasmania's first Big W store.
Rosny Park also has a Village Cinemas complex, one of only four in the state. There is also a Raine & Horne Real Estate and Harcourts Real estate.

Rosny Park is home to Rosny College a government-provided senior secondary college, which also teaches adult night courses.

Rosny Park is home to the Rosny Park Public Golf Course, a 9-hole course, as well as Kangaroo Bay cricket ground, skateboard ramps and netball courts, Rosny Park Tennis Club, and Rosny Park Bowls Club.

Nearby Charles Hand Memorial Park provides public green space and also hosts an annual Christmas Carols by Candlelight ceremony which draws crowds in the thousands.

Rosny Park Transit Mall is a local hub and is serviced by several routes which reach most suburban areas of the City of Clarence, and some outer districts such as Lauderdale, as well as services to Hobart Bus Station and Glenorchy.

References

Localities of City of Clarence